The Lebaudy République (later known as La République) was a semi-rigid airship built for the French army in Moisson, France, by sugar manufacturers Lebaudy Frères. She was a sister ship of the Patrie, the main differences between the two being in the dimensions of the gasbag (or 'envelope') and the ballonet. Although she was operationally successful, the République crashed in 1909 due to a mechanical failure, killing all four crew members.

Background

The République's predecessor, the Lebaudy Patrie, had been so successful that three further airships of the same design were ordered by the French government in March 1907. Two of them saw service under the names République and Liberté. The République was completed in June 1908, flew for the first time June 24 and was handed over to the French army on 31 July of that year.

Other governments had been equally impressed, and the Russian and Austrian armies each ordered an airship of the same design. The Russie saw service in Russia as the Lebed, and the Autrichienne (built under license in Vienna by the Motor-Luftfahrzeug Gesellschaft) was operated by the Austrian army under the designation M.II.

Design and development
The main structural components of the République, like those of the Patrie, were the gasbag, a nickel-steel frame or keel, and a gondola suspended from the frame on steel cables. Contained within the envelope was a ballonet, the function of which was to ensure that sufficient gas pressure was maintained in the envelope at all times, irrespective of the degree of expansion or contraction of the lifting gas. These components were essentially the same as for the Patrie, the only differences initially being in the dimensions of the envelope and the ballonet, which are given in the Specifications section below. The modular structure enabled the envelope volume to be varied without affecting  the keel or the gondola. For a more detailed description, see Lebaudy Patrie.

Operational history

First flight
The République's first flight took place at the Lebaudy base at Moisson on 24 June 1908. She was flown to Chalais-Meudon to take up her military duties on 31 July 1908.

Military operations
During the autumn of 1908 and the spring and summer of 1909, the République was engaged in two campaigns of peacetime military operations from her base at the French airship headquarters at Chalais-Meudon, the objectives of which were to train the pilots and the support team and to assess the airship's capabilities. These test flights included a long flight on Wed. 4 August 1909, during which she covered 130 miles (209 km) in 6 hours; this was reported in Flight Magazine on 7 August 1909. 

In 1909, the army decided to integrate airship reconnaissance into its military manoeuvres of that year ("Les grandes Manoeuvres du Bourbonnais") and the République was assigned to this task. A temporary hangar, comprising a metal framework over which a fabric skin was draped, was constructed at Lapalisse to accommodate the airship. On 3 September 1909, the République set off from Chalais-Meudon for the flight to Lapalisse. After 62 miles (105 km), while over La Charité-sur-Loire, the motor overheated due to poor water circulation and had to be stopped immediately, requiring the crew to land in poor conditions at Policards, in the commune of Jussy-le-Chaudrier.

Some local farm workers who were on the scene caught the guide ropes but were unable to prevent the gondola from impaling itself on an apple tree, which damaged the airship's keel and gondola in several places. With the keel and gondola damaged and given the loss of a quantity of gas, it was decided not to risk the République suffering the same fate as the Patrie (which was lost when a storm blew up while she was moored in the open due to mechanical problems), but to deflate the gas-bag immediately. The gondola and keel were sent on to Lapalisse for repairs and the envelope was returned for repairs to Chalais-Meudon. The necessary repairs were made sufficiently quickly for the République to be reassembled and inflated, ready to take part successfully in the manoeuvres by 12 September 1909 as planned.

Final flight
After the manoeuvres the crew which was assigned the task of returning the République to Chalais-Meudon decided to fly her back, rather than have her deflated and dismantled for the return journey by rail. On the morning of 25 September 1909 while near the Château of Avrilly , one of the metal propeller blades sheared off its shaft and pierced the envelope, which deflated catastrophically, causing the République to crash into ground at high speed, killing all four crew members: Capt. Marchal, Lt. Chauré, and the 'Adjudants mecaniciens', Vincenot and Réau.

Epilogue

The French government took immediate steps to replace the République, ordering two airships to replace her. The République's sister-ship, the Liberté, already in production, was modified by the addition of a second engine following the loss of the République before being commissioned to take up her military role, based at the garrison of Belfort.

A new airship, named Capitaine-Marchal in honour of the deceased commander of the République, was presented to the French government by Lebaudy Frères.

After the accident criticisms were voiced about the advisability of operating the République following her accident prior to the manoeuvres and about the design of the airship's propellers; the latter point was addressed in the order for replacement propellers.

Opinions such as those expressed by The New York Times that the "War Dirigibles Must Yield to the Aeroplane" and "France Loses Faith in Army Balloons – Loss of Four Lives in La République Accident Turns Public Favor to Aeroplanes" reflected a growing awareness of the relative potentials of airships and aeroplanes, although all major powers continued to invest in military airships for some years. Airships were to be used throughout most of World War I, before their vulnerability to improved heavier-than-air aircraft led to their being abandoned for military purposes; the British military Airship Branch was disbanded in 1921.

Specifications

See also

References

Notes

Bibliography

External links

1900s French military reconnaissance aircraft
Airships of France
Aviation accidents and incidents in France
Hydrogen airships
Aviation accidents and incidents in 1909
Accidents and incidents involving balloons and airships
1909 in France
Aircraft first flown in 1908